Philippe Candeloro (born 17 February 1972) is a French former competitive figure skater. He is a two-time Olympic bronze medalist (1994, 1998), a two-time World medalist (1994 silver, 1995 bronze), a two-time European silver medalist (1993, 1997), and a four-time French national champion (1994–97). He has been a commentator for French television during figure skating events at the Olympics. He also made special appearance as himself and a villain's victim named "Frozer" in Miraculous: Tales of Ladybug & Cat Noir.

Early years
Philippe Candeloro was born in Courbevoie, the youngest of four children. His father, Luigi, was a mason, and, a few years after Philippe's birth, built a family home in the Parisian suburb of Colombes.

Early in his childhood Candeloro enjoyed swimming and elastic springboard. In 1979, at age seven, he began taking weekly ice skating lessons. During one of his first lessons, trainer André Brunet noted Candeloro's potential and invited him to increase his skating practices. At first, he participated in the village's hockey team but quickly veered into figure skating. He stole one of his first pairs of skates. His mother paid for them when the theft was discovered.

Skating career
Within a few years of stepping onto the ice, Candeloro found himself on the fast track with the French figure skating federation. He was invited to a summer training camp at Font-Romeu, which would become an annual event for him. When he was 10, the French Federation offered him a place at the prestigious national training center in Paris, INSEP. Candeloro refused this invitation, opting instead to continue training in Colombes with Brunet. At the age of 16, he left school to concentrate full-time on his training.

By sixteen, Candeloro was receiving attention from both the French Federation and the international skating community. He participated in the closing ceremony at the 1988 Winter Olympics in Calgary and began to work with choreographer Natacha Dabadie. His goal of competing at the 1992 Olympics in Albertville, France was derailed in October 1991 when he broke his leg. He finished third at the French nationals and was assigned to the post-Olympic World Championships, where he placed ninth.

In the 1992–93 season, Candeloro won gold at the 1992 NHK Trophy and silver at the 1993 European Championships. He finished fifth at the World Championships. In the first half of the following season, he placed fifth at Skate America and earned medals at three events — Piruetten, International de Paris, and NHK Trophy — before becoming French national champion for the first time. Candeloro finished off the podium at the 1994 European Championships but a month later he won the bronze medal at the 1994 Winter Olympics in Lillehammer, Norway. He ended his season with a silver medal at the 1994 World Championships in Chiba, Japan. He then toured with Champions on Ice in the United States and performed in other shows. In France, he attracted sponsorships and television and print publicity.

Candeloro had mixed results in the following years. The bronze medalist at the 1995 World Championships in Birmingham, England, he placed ninth the next season at the 1996 World Championships in Edmonton, Canada. After finishing off the podium at three Europeans in a row, he won silver at the 1997 European Championships in Paris, France.

In the 1997–98 season, Candeloro again placed fifth at the pre-Olympic European Championships but went on to win the bronze medal at the 1998 Winter Olympics in Nagano, Japan. Following his second Olympics, Candeloro turned pro and appeared in a wide variety of tours and professional competitions. The "Philippe Candeloro Japan Tour 2001" was named after him. It was the predecessor of the annual touring show Fantasy on Ice, where Candeloro himself was a recurring cast member until 2019. In the United States he was a popular fixture with Champions on Ice; in Europe he founded the successful Candel Euro Tour and performed with the "Holiday on Ice" tour. He also appeared as Captain Sheng in a Disney television special based on the cartoon Mulan, with Michelle Kwan playing the title role. He started his farewell tour, "Hello and Goodbye", in France in February 2008.

Candeloro's signature move, in which he spins and drops to his knees on the ice, is not allowed in amateur competition. He developed the spin accidentally when he slipped to his knees during a scratch spin.

Candeloro has worked as a sports journalist. During the 2006 Olympics, Candeloro stirred controversy by commenting that Olympic champion Shizuka Arakawa was "worth a bowl of rice" after rising from third place to win the gold medal. Apologizing to the Japanese ambassador to France, Hiroshi Hirabayashi, who was unaware of the comment, French public television stated, "We were taken aback by the comment." In 2014, Candeloro and his co-commentator Nelson Montfort were criticized for some of their comments on female skaters at the Sochi Olympics. In March 2014, the Conseil supérieur de l'audiovisuel issued a warning to the broadcaster, France Télévisions, stating that some comments were "inappropriate" and "reflected sexist prejudice".

Candeloro is known to be a big fan of Japanese figure skater Mao Asada, calling himself her 'godfather'.

Other 
In 2011, he was one of the contestants during the second season of Danse avec les stars.
The municipal ice rink in his hometown of Colombes was renamed in his honor in 2018.

Personal life
Candeloro is married to ballet dancer Olivia Darmon, with whom he has three daughters: Luna Nizza, Maya Estella and Thalia Soleya. He was introduced to his future wife by the choreographer of his 1994 Olympic program, Natasha Dabadie. He speaks several languages besides French, including English and Italian.

In 2008, Candeloro was involved in the development of a namesake rose, the Philippe Candeloro rose with Lyonnais rose breeder Jean-Pierre Guillot.

He narrowly escaped death in the Villa Castelli helicopter collision in 2015, when he was forced to wait for one of the helicopters on the next flight due to over-occupancy. The accident claimed 10 lives including three French athletes.

Programs

Results

GP: Champions Series (Grand Prix)

References

1972 births
Figure skaters at the 1994 Winter Olympics
Figure skaters at the 1998 Winter Olympics
French male single skaters
Living people
French sportspeople of Italian descent
Olympic bronze medalists for France
Olympic figure skaters of France
Olympic medalists in figure skating
World Figure Skating Championships medalists
European Figure Skating Championships medalists
Medalists at the 1998 Winter Olympics
Medalists at the 1994 Winter Olympics
People from Courbevoie
Goodwill Games medalists in figure skating
Sportspeople from Hauts-de-Seine
Competitors at the 1994 Goodwill Games
Fantasy on Ice main cast members